Kokarevka is a rural locality (a khutor) in Novopostoyalovskoye Rural Settlement, Rossoshansky District, Voronezh Oblast, Russia. The population was 415 as of 2010. There are 7 streets.

Geography 
Kokarevka is located 10 km north of Rossosh (the district's administrative centre) by road. Nachalo is the nearest rural locality.

References 

Rural localities in Rossoshansky District